Aliaksandr Mikalayevich Buikevich (born 19 November 1984) is a Belarusian sabre fencer, European champion in 2008 and team silver medallist at the 2011 World Championships in Catania. At the 2008 Summer Olympics, he reached the quarter-finals in the individual sabre, losing to Romania's Mihai Covaliu, while the Belarusian sabre team also reached the quarter-finals. At the 2012 Summer Olympics, he competed in the men's sabre, but was defeated in the table of 16 by Romania's Rareș Dumitrescu.  The Belarusian team again reached the quarter-finals. Buikevich qualified for the 2016 Summer Olympics in Rio de Janeiro as the only Belarusian fencer. In men's sabre in the table of 32 he defeated Joseph Polossifakis of Canada. He could not advance to the quarter-finals as in the table of 16 he lost to the eventual winner Áron Szilágyi of Hungary, who claimed his second consecutive gold medal at the Olympics individual men's sabre. Buikevich finished 12th in the event.

References

External links

 
  (archive)
 
 

Belarusian male sabre fencers
Living people
Olympic fencers of Belarus
Fencers at the 2008 Summer Olympics
Fencers at the 2012 Summer Olympics
Fencers at the 2016 Summer Olympics
1984 births
Sportspeople from Minsk
Universiade medalists in fencing
Universiade silver medalists for Belarus
European Games competitors for Belarus
Fencers at the 2015 European Games
Medalists at the 2009 Summer Universiade
21st-century Belarusian people